The American Humanist Association (AHA) is a non-profit organization in the United States that advances secular humanism.

The American Humanist Association was founded in 1941 and currently provides legal assistance to defend the constitutional rights of secular and religious minorities, lobbies Congress on church-state separation and other issues, and maintains a grassroots network of 250 local affiliates and chapters that engage in social activism and community-building events. The AHA has several publications, including The Humanist, Free Mind, peer-reviewed semi-annual scholastic journal Essays in the Philosophy of Humanism, and TheHumanist.com. The organization states that it has over 34,000 members.

History
In 1927, an organization called the "Humanist Fellowship" began at a gathering in Chicago. In 1928, the Fellowship started publishing the New Humanist magazine with  H.G. Creel as first editor. The New Humanist was published from 1928 to 1936. The first Humanist Manifesto was issued by a conference held at the University of Chicago in 1933. Signatories included John Dewey, but the majority were ministers (chiefly Unitarian) and theologians. They identified humanism as an ideology that espouses reason, ethics, and social and economic justice.

By 1935, the Humanist Fellowship had become the "Humanist Press Association", the first national association of humanism in the United States.

In July 1939, a group of Quakers, inspired by the 1933 Humanist Manifesto, incorporated the Humanist Society of Friends as a religious, educational, charitable nonprofit organization authorized to issue charters and train & ordain its own ministry. Upon ordination these ministers were then accorded the same rights and privileges granted by law to priests, ministers, and rabbis of traditional theistic religions.

In 1941, Curtis Reese led the reorganization and incorporation of the "Humanist Press Association" as the American Humanist Association. Along with its reorganization, the AHA began printing The Humanist magazine. The AHA was originally headquartered in Yellow Springs, Ohio, then San Francisco, California, and, in 1978, Amherst, New York. Subsequently, the AHA moved to Washington, D.C.

In 1952, the AHA became a founding member of the International Humanist and Ethical Union (IHEU) in Amsterdam, Netherlands.

The AHA was the first national membership organization to support abortion rights. Around the same time, the AHA partnered with the American Ethical Union (AEU) to help establish the rights of non-theistic conscientious objectors to the Vietnam War. In the late 1960s, the AHA also secured a religious tax exemption in support of its celebrant program, allowing Humanist celebrants to legally officiate at weddings, perform chaplaincy functions, and in other ways enjoy the same rights as traditional clergy.

In 1991, the AHA took control of the Humanist Society, a religious Humanist organization that now runs the celebrant program. After this transfer, the AHA commenced the process of jettisoning its religious tax exemption and resumed its exclusively educational status. Today the AHA is recognized by the U.S. Internal Revenue Service as a nonprofit, tax exempt, 501(c)(3), publicly supported educational organization.

Membership numbers are disputed, but Djupe and Olson place it as "definitely fewer than 50,000."  The AHA has over 575,000 followers on Facebook and over 42,000 followers on Twitter.

Adjuncts and affiliates
The AHA is the supervising organization for various Humanist affiliates and adjunct organizations.

Black Humanist Alliance 
The Black Humanist Alliance of the American Humanist Association was founded in 2016 as a pillar of its new "Initiatives for Social Justice." Like the Feminist Humanist Alliance and the LGBT Humanist Alliance, the Black Humanist Alliance uses an intersectional approach to addressing issues facing the Black community. As its mission states, the BHA "concern ourselves with confronting expressions of religious hegemony in public policy," but is "also devoted to confronting social, economic, and political deprivations that disproportionately impact Black America due to centuries of culturally ingrained prejudices."

Feminist Humanist Alliance
The Feminist Humanist Alliance (formerly the Feminist Caucus) of the American Humanist Association was established in 1977 as a coalition of  women and men within the AHA to work toward the advancement of women's rights and equality between the sexes in all aspects of society. Originally called the Women's Caucus, the new name was adopted in 1985 as more representative of all the members of the caucus and of the caucus' goals. Over the years, members of the Caucus have advocated for the passage of the Equal Rights Amendment and participated in various public demonstrations, including marches for women's and civil rights. In 1982, the Caucus established its annual Humanist Heroine Award, with the initial award being presented to Sonia Johnson. Others receiving the awards have included Tish Sommers, Christine Craft, and Fran Hosken. In 2012 the Caucus declared it would be organizing around two principal efforts: "Refocusing on passing the ERA" and "Promoting the Universal Declaration of Human Rights."

In 2016, the Feminist Caucus reorganized as the Feminist Humanist Alliance as a component of their larger "Initiatives for Social Justice." As stated on its website, the "refinement in vision" emphasized "FHA's more active partnership with outreach programs and social justice campaigns with distinctly inclusive feminist objectives." Its current goal is to provide a "movement powered by and for women, transpeople, and genderqueer people to fight for social justice. We are united to create inclusive and diverse spaces for activists and allies on the local and national level."

LGBTQ Humanist Alliance 
The LGBTQ Humanist Alliance (formerly LGBT Humanist Council) of the American Humanist Association is committed to advancing equality for lesbian, gay, bisexual, and transgender people and their families. The alliance "seeks to cultivate safe and affirming communities, promote humanist values, and achieve full equality and social liberation of LGBTQ persons."

Paralleling the Black Humanist Alliance and the Feminist Humanist Alliance, the Council reformed in 2016 as the LGBTQ Humanist Alliance as a larger part of the AHA's "Initiatives for Social Justice".

Disaster Recovery
In 2014, the American Humanist Association (AHA) and Foundation Beyond Belief (FBB) merged their respective charitable programs Humanist Charities (established in 2005) and Humanist Crisis Response (established in 2011). AHA's Executive Director Roy Speckhardt commented that, “This merger is a positive move that will grow the relief efforts of the humanist community. The end result will be more money directed to charitable activities, dispelling the false claim that nonbelievers don’t give to charity.”

Now Foundation Beyond Belief's Disaster Recovery program, this effort serves as a focal point for the humanist response to major natural disasters and complex humanitarian crises all over the world. The program coordinates financial support as well as trained humanist volunteers to help impacted communities. The Disaster Recovery program is sustained through the ongoing partnership between FBB and AHA, and ensures that our community's efforts are centralized and efficient.

Between 2014–2018, Humanist Disaster Recovery has raised over $250,000 for victims of the Syrian Refugee Crisis, Refugee Children of the U.S. Border, Tropical Cyclone Sam, and the Nepal and Ecuadoran Earthquakes, Hurricane Matthew in Haiti, and Hurricanes Irma and Maria. In addition to grants for recovery efforts, volunteers have also helped to rebuild homes and schools in the following locations: Columbia, South Carolina after the effects of Hurricane Joaquin, in Denham Springs, Louisiana; and in Houston, Texas after the flooding from Hurricane Harvey.

Appignani Humanist Legal Center
The Association launched the Appignani Humanist Legal Center (AHLC) in 2006 to ensure that humanists' constitutional rights are represented in court. Through amicus activity, litigation, and legal advocacy, a team of cooperating lawyers, including Jim McCollum, Wendy Kaminer, and Michael Newdow, provide legal assistance by challenging perceived violations of the Establishment Clause.

 The AHLC's first independent litigation was filed on November 29, 2006, in the United States District Court for the Southern District of Florida. Attorney James Hurley, the AHLC lawyer serving as lead counsel, filed suit against the Palm Beach County Supervisor of Elections on behalf of Plaintiff Jerry Rabinowitz, whose polling place was a church in Delray Beach, Florida. The church featured numerous religious symbols, including signs exhorting people to “Make a Difference with God” and anti-abortion posters, which the AHLC claimed demonstrated a violation of the Establishment Clause. In the voting area itself, "Rabinowitz observed many religious symbols in plain view, both surrounding the election judges and in direct line above the voting machines. He took photographs that will be entered in evidence." U.S. District Judge Donald M. Middlebrooks ruled that Jerry Rabinowitz did not have standing to challenge the placement of polling sites in churches, and dismissed the case.
In February 2014, AHA brought suit to force the removal of the Bladensburg Peace Cross, a war memorial honoring 49 residents of Prince George's County, Maryland, who died in World War I. AHA represented the plaintiffs, Mr. Lowe, who drives by the memorial "about once a month" and Fred Edwords, former AHA Executive director. AHA argued that the presence of a Christian religious symbol on public property violates the First Amendment clause prohibiting government from establishing a religion. Town officials feel the monument to have historic and patriotic significant to local residents. A member of the local American Legion Post said, "I mean, to me, it's like they're slapping the veterans in the face. I mean, that's a tribute to the veterans, and for some reason, I have no idea what they have against veterans. I mean, if it wasn't for us veterans they wouldn't have the right to do what they're trying to do."
In March 2014, a Southern California woman reluctantly removed a roadside memorial from near a freeway ramp where her 19-year-old son was killed after the AHA contacted the city council calling the cross on city-owned property a "serious constitutional violation".
AHLC represented an atheist family who claimed that the equal rights amendment of the Massachusetts constitution prohibits mandatory daily recitations of the Pledge of Allegiance because the anthem contains the phrase “under God”. In November 2012 the Massachusetts Supreme Judicial Court permitted a direct appeal with oral arguments set for early 20 but . in May 2014, the Massachusetts Supreme Judicial Court ruled in a unanimous decision that the daily recitation of the phrase “under god” in the US Pledge of Allegiance does not violate the plaintiffs' equal protection rights under the Massachusetts Constitution.
In February 2015 New Jersey Superior Court Judge David F. Bauman dismissed a lawsuit challenging the Pledge of Allegiance, ruling that "...the Pledge of Allegiance does not violate the rights of those who don't believe in God and does not have to be removed from the patriotic message." In a twenty-one page decision, Bauman wrote, "Under (the association members') reasoning, the very constitution under which (the members) seek redress for perceived atheistic marginalization could itself be deem unconstitutional, an absurd proposition which (association members) do not and cannot advance here."

Advertising campaigns
The American Humanist Association has received media attention for its various advertising campaigns; in 2010, the AHA's campaign was said to be the more expensive than similar ad campaigns from the American Atheists and Freedom From Religion Foundation.

In 2008 it ran ads on buses in Washington, D.C., that proclaimed "Why believe in a god? Just be good for goodness' sake", and since 2009 the organization has paid for billboard advertisements nationwide. One such billboard, which stated "No God...No Problem" was repeatedly vandalized.

In 2010 it launched another ad campaign promoting Humanism, which The New York Times said was the "first (atheist campaign) to include spots on television and cable" and was described by CNN as the "largest, most extensive advertising campaign ever by a godless organization". The campaign featured violent or sexist quotes from holy books, contrasted with quotes from humanist thinkers, including physicist Albert Einstein, and was largely underwritten by Todd Stiefel, a retired pharmaceutical company executive.

In late 2011 it launched a holiday billboard campaign, placing advertisements in 7 different cities: Kearny, New Jersey; Washington, D.C.; Cranston, Rhode Island; Bastrop, Louisiana; Oregon City, Oregon; College Station, Texas and Rochester Hills, Michigan", cities where AHA stated "atheists have experienced discrimination due to their lack of belief in a traditional god". The organization spent more than $200,000 on their campaign which included a billboard reading "Yes, Virginia, there is no god."

In November 2012, the AHA launched a national ad campaign to promote a new website, KidsWithoutGod.com, with ads using the slogans "I'm getting a bit old for imaginary friends" and "You're Not The Only One". The campaign included bus advertising in Washington, DC, a billboard in Moscow, Idaho, and online ads on the family of websites run by Cheezburger and Pandora Radio, as well as Facebook, Reddit, Google, and YouTube. Ads were turned down because of their content by Disney, Time for Kids and National Geographic Kids.

National Day of Reason
The National Day of Reason was created by the American Humanist Association and the Washington Area Secular Humanists in 2003. In addition to serving as a holiday for secularists, the National Day of Reason was created in response to the unconstitutionality of the National Day of Prayer. According to the organizers of the event, the National Day of Prayer "violates the First Amendment of the United States Constitution because it asks federal, state, and local government entities to set aside tax dollar supported time and space to engage in religious ceremonies". Several organizations associated with the National Day of Reason have organized food drives and blood donations, while other groups have called for an end to prayer invocations at city meetings. Other organizations, such as the Oklahoma Atheists and the Minnesota Atheists, have organized local secular celebrations as alternatives to the National Day of Prayer. Additionally, many individuals affiliated with these atheistic groups choose to protest the official National Day of Prayer.

Reason Rally 
In 2012, the American Humanist Association co-sponsored the Reason Rally, a national gathering of "humanists, atheists, freethinkers and nonbelievers from across the United States and abroad" in Washington, D.C. The rally, held on the National Mall, had speakers such as Richard Dawkins, James Randi, Adam Savage, and student activist Jessica Ahlqvist. According to the Huffington Post, the event's attendance was between 8,000–10,000 while the Atlantic reported nearly 20,000. The AHA also co-sponsored the 2016 Reason Rally at the Lincoln Memorial.

Famous awardees 
The American Humanist Association has named a "Humanist of the Year" annually since 1953. It has also granted other honors to numerous leading figures, including Salman Rushdie (Outstanding Lifetime Achievement Award in Cultural Humanism 2007),  Oliver Stone (Humanist Arts Award, 1996), Katharine Hepburn (Humanist Arts Award 1985), John Dewey (Humanist Pioneer Award, 1954), Jack Kevorkian (Humanist Hero Award, 1996) and Vashti McCollum (Distinguished Service Award, 1991).

AHA's Humanists of the Year 
The AHA website presents the list of the following Humanists of the Year:

 Anton J. Carlson – 1953
 Arthur F. Bentley – 1954
 James P. Warbasse – 1955
 Charles Judson Herrick – 1956
 Margaret Sanger – 1957
 Oscar Riddle – 1958
 Brock Chisholm – 1959
 Leó Szilárd – 1960
 Linus Pauling – 1961
 Julian Huxley – 1962
 Hermann J. Muller – 1963
 Carl Rogers – 1964
 Hudson Hoagland – 1965
 Erich Fromm – 1966
 Abraham H. Maslow – 1967
 Benjamin Spock – 1968
 R. Buckminster Fuller – 1969
 A. Philip Randolph – 1970
 Albert Ellis – 1971
 B.F. Skinner – 1972
 Thomas Szasz – 1973
 Joseph Fletcher – 1974
 Mary Calderone – 1974
 Henry Morgentaler – 1975
 Betty Friedan – 1975
 Jonas E. Salk – 1976
 Corliss Lamont – 1977
 Margaret E. Kuhn – 1978
 Edwin H. Wilson – 1979
 Andrei Sakharov – 1980
 Carl Sagan – 1981
 Helen Caldicott – 1982
 Lester A. Kirkendall – 1983
 Isaac Asimov – 1984
 John Kenneth Galbraith – 1985
 Faye Wattleton – 1986
 Margaret Atwood – 1987
 Leo Pfeffer – 1988
 Gerald A. Larue – 1989
 Ted Turner – 1990
 Werner Fornos – 1991
 Lester R. Brown – 1991
 Kurt Vonnegut – 1992
 Richard D. Lamm – 1993
 Lloyd Morain – 1994
 Mary Morain – 1994
 Ashley Montagu – 1995
 Richard Dawkins – 1996; revoked 2021
 Alice Walker – 1997
 Barbara Ehrenreich – 1998
 Edward O. Wilson – 1999
 William F. Schulz – 2000
 Stephen Jay Gould – 2001
 Steven Weinberg – 2002
 Sherwin T. Wine – 2003
 Daniel Dennett – 2004
 Murray Gell-Mann – 2005
 Steven Pinker – 2006
 Joyce Carol Oates – 2007
 Pete Stark – 2008
 PZ Myers – 2009
 Bill Nye – 2010
 Rebecca Goldstein – 2011 
 Gloria Steinem – 2012
 Dan Savage – 2013
 Barney Frank – 2014
 Lawrence M. Krauss – 2015; revoked 2018
 Jared Diamond – 2016
 Adam Savage – 2017
 Jennifer Ouellette – 2018
 Salman Rushdie – 2019
 Jared Huffman – 2020
 Anthony Fauci – 2021
 no award given – 2022

See also
Humanism
Secular humanism
John Dewey
Charles Francis Potter
Bertrand Russell
List of general awards in the humanities

References

Further reading

 Garry, Patrick M. "When Anti-Establishment Becomes Exclusion: The Supreme Court's Opinion in American Legion v. American Humanist Association and the Flip Side of the Endorsement Test." Nebraska Law Review 98 (2019): 643+ .
 Hyde, M. Allison. "American Legion v. American Humanist Ass'n: Exempting Longstanding Governmental Religious Displays from Establishment Clause Scrutiny and How the Endorsement Test Could Have Prevented It." Maryland Law Review 79 (2019): 836+ online.

 Myers, Richard S. "American Legion v. American Humanist Association and the Future of the Establishment Clause." Ave Maria Law Review 19 (2021): 91-104. online.
 Pinn, Anthony B., ed. By these hands: A documentary history of African American humanism (NYU Press, 2001).
 Pinn, Anthony B. The end of god-talk: An African American humanist theology (Oxford University Press, 2012).

External links 

 
 

1941 establishments in the United States
501(c)(3) organizations
Advocacy groups in the United States
Atheism activism
Atheism in the United States
Atheist organizations
Charities based in Washington, D.C.
Church–state separation advocacy organizations
Criticism of religion
Disengagement from religion
Educational charities based in the United States
Educational organizations based in the United States
Ethics organizations
Freethought in the United States
Freethought organizations
Government watchdog groups in the United States
Humanist associations
Nonpartisan organizations in the United States
Non-profit organizations based in Washington, D.C.
Nontheism
Organizations established in 1941
Science advocacy organizations
Scientific organizations based in the United States
Scientific organizations established in 1991
Scientific skepticism
Secular humanism
Secularism
Secularism in the United States
Secularist organizations
Separation of church and state
Skeptic organizations in the United States
Think tanks based in the United States
Think tanks established in 1941